Boesmanspruit is a small stream originating south of Secunda, Mpumalanga, South Africa, it runs from there in a southwesterly direction until it joins the Waterval River (English: Water Fall River; this name is never used however).

See also 
 List of rivers of South Africa

Rivers of Mpumalanga